Sorolopha nagaii is a moth of the family Tortricidae. It is found in Thailand.

References

Moths described in 1989
Olethreutini
Moths of Asia